Gbalèkaha is a town in northern Ivory Coast. It is the seat of the sub-prefecture of Sédiogo in Sinématiali Department, Poro Region, Savanes District.

Notes

Populated places in Savanes District
Populated places in Poro Region